The 2010–11 Segunda División season (known as the Liga Adelante for sponsorship reasons) was the 80th since its establishment. The first matches of the season were played on 27 August 2010, the regular league ended on 4 June 2011, and the season ended with the promotion play-off finals on 18 June 2011.

The first goal of the season was scored by Javi Guerra, who scored a sixth-minute goal for Real Valladolid against Villarreal B in the early kick-off. The first red card of the season was given to Hernán Pérez from Villarreal B in their opening game against Valladolid. The first hat-trick was scored by Quini in the match between Alcorcón and Girona.

Teams 
Real Valladolid, Tenerife and Xerez are the teams which were relegated from La Liga the previous season. Tenerife and Xerez made their immediate return to the second level after just one season in the top division, while Valladolid ended a three-year tenure in La Liga. Real Sociedad was promoted after three consecutive seasons in the second level, Levante was promoted after two seasons and Hércules after 13 seasons, its longest absence from first division.

The teams which were relegated the previous season were Castellón, Real Unión, Murcia and Cádiz. These four were replaced by another four play-off winners from Segunda División B: Granada (2ªB champion), Ponferradina (2ªB runner-up), Barcelona B (play-off winner) and Alcorcón (play-off winner).

Stadia and locations

Personnel and sponsorship 

1. Barcelona B makes a donation to UNICEF in order to display the charity's logo on the club's kit.
2. Club's own brand.

Managerial changes

League table

Positions by round

Results

Promotion play-offs 

This season a new promotion phase (known as Promoción de ascenso) was introduced to determine the third team which promoted to 2011–12 La Liga. Teams placed between third and sixth position (excluding reserve teams) took part in the promotion play-offs. Fifth placed faced against the fourth, while the sixth positioned team faced against the third. The first leg of the semi-finals was played on 8–9 June 2011 with the best positioned team playing at home on the second leg which was played on 11–12 June 2011. The final was also two-legged, with the first leg on 15 June 2011 and the second leg on 18 June 2011 with the best positioned team also playing at home on the second leg. Elche and Granada played the final phase, where Granada CF was promoted to La Liga for the first time in 35 years, having spent 26 of them in Segunda División B and Tercera División. Celta Vigo and Valladolid were eliminated in semi-finals. Barcelona B could not participate in the play-offs as they are Barcelona's reserve team.

Play-offs

Semi-finals

First leg

Second leg

Final

First leg

Second leg

Pichichi Trophy for Top Goalscorers 
Last updated 4 June 2011

Zamora Trophy for Top Goalkeepers 
Last updated 4 June 2011

Fair Play award 
This award is given annually since 1999 to the team with the best fair play during the season. This ranking takes into account aspects such as cards, suspension of matches, audience behaviour and other penalties. This section not only aims to know this aspect, but also serves to break the tie in teams that are tied in all the other rules: points, head-to-head, goal difference and goals scored.

 Source: Guia As de La Liga 2011–12, p. 164 (sports magazine)

Season statistics

Scoring 
 First goal of the season: Javi Guerra for Real Valladolid against Villarreal B (27 August 2010)
 Fastest goal in a match: 42 seconds – Cala for Cartagena against Las Palmas (19 December 2010)
 Goal scored at the latest point in a match: 90+5 minutes
 Ranko Despotović for Girona against Barcelona B (8 January 2011)
 Andrija Delibašić for Rayo Vallecano against Las Palmas (23 April 2011)
 Quini for Alcorcó against Granada (15 May 2011)
 Widest winning margin: 5
 Granada 5–0 Xerez (30 October 2010)
 Granada 6–1 Gimnàstic (12 December 2010)
 Alcorcón 5–0 Las Palmas (12 February 2011)
 Salamanca 0–5 Valladolid (27 March 2011)
 Betis 5–0 Cartagena (16 April 2011)
 Most goals in a match: 10 – Numancia 4–6 Barcelona B (26 February 2011)
 First hat-trick of the season: Quini for Alcorcón against Girona (18 September 2010)
 First own goal of the season: Albert Serra for Tenerife against Girona (28 August 2010)
 Most goals by one player in a single match: 4 – Alexandre Geijo for Granada against Barcelona B (13 November 2010)
 Most goals by one team in a match: 6
 Granada 6–1 Gimnàstic (12 December 2010)
 Numancia 4–6 Barcelona B (26 February 2011)
 Most goals in one half by one team: 5
 Alcorcón 5–0 Las Palmas (12 February 2011)
 Numancia 4–6 Barcelona B (26 February 2011)
 Salamanca 0–5 Valladolid (27 March 2011)
 Most goals scored by losing team: 4
 Valladolid 4–5 Numancia (11 December 2010)
 Numancia 4–6 Barcelona B (26 February 2011)
 Salamanca 5–4 Elche (30 April 2011)

Cards 
 First yellow card: Natxo Insa for Villarreal B against Valladolid (27 August 2010)
 First red card: Hernán Pérez for Villarreal B against Valladolid (27 August 2010)''

Teams by autonomous community

See also 
 List of Spanish football transfers summer 2010
 List of Spanish football transfers winter 2010–11
 2010–11 La Liga
 2010–11 Segunda División B
 2010–11 Copa del Rey

References 

 
Segunda División seasons
2010–11 in Spanish football leagues
Spain